Yes, Virginia is an animated Christmas television special created by Wayne Best and Matt MacDonald, and produced by JWT Productions, The Ebeling Group, and Starz Animation, with sponsorship from Macy's. It first aired December 11, 2009 on CBS.  It was based on Francis Pharcellus Church's famous 1897 editorial, "Yes, Virginia, there is a Santa Claus" in The (New York) Sun. The special featured the voice talents of Bea Miller as Virginia O'Hanlon and Neil Patrick Harris as her father, Philip.

There was a previous animated special, Yes, Virginia, There Is a Santa Claus, broadcast in 1974.

See also
 List of Christmas films
 Santa Claus in film

References

External links 
 

Christmas television specials
Films scored by Nicholas Hooper